New Jersey Transit operates the following routes within Passaic and Bergen counties. All routes are exact fare lines. Only routes operated directly from New Jersey Transit's Northern Division and route 772 operate on Sundays.

Northern Division
These lines are operated from Market Street Garage in Paterson, New Jersey. Destinations shown are for the full route except for branching. Some trips may only travel a portion of the route.

Contract operations
The Passaic County & Bergen County lines are operated by Community Coach in Paramus. Destinations shown are for the full route except for branching. Some trips may only travel a portion of the route. There is no Sunday service on any line listed below except route 772; some routes may have additional restrictions.

Passaic County local routes

Bergen County local routes

Former Routes

External links
New Jersey Transit - Bus
Unofficial New Jersey Transit bus map

New Jersey Transit bus routes
 700
New Jersey Transit bus routes
Lists of New Jersey bus routes